Ngô Phương Lan (born 12 March 1987, in Hanoi) is Miss Vietnam World 2007 and first runner up at Miss Vietnam UK 2007.

When Lan was 1st grade in Vietnam, her family moved to the U.S. (her father was an Ambassador to the United Nations) where she studied 1st through 7th grade in New York City. In 2000, she returned to Hanoi and attended the United Nations International School. She later followed her family to Switzerland in 2002. Currently, she is a student at a small college in the faculty of International Relations, Switzerland. She is 1.70m tall.

Ngo Phuong Lan can speak Vietnamese, English, French. In the question and answer part during the competition of Miss World Vietnamese 2007, she won the prize for the most intelligent answer about why charity work is often involved with beauty pageants, by saying that kindness is also a form of beauty.

Ngo Phuong Lan has declined the invitation to represent Vietnam at Miss World 2007 due to her studies in Switzerland. Instead, 2nd runner-up Dang Minh Thu will now take her place. The decision was made by Elite Vietnam, a well known Vietnamese modeling agency.

References

External links

 Nhan Dan News article
 Vietnamnet Bridge news article

Living people
1987 births
Vietnamese beauty pageant winners